Richard Peace is an American theologian, being the Robert Boyd Munger Professor of Evangelism and Spiritual Formation at Fuller Theological Seminary.

References

Year of birth missing (living people)
Living people
Fuller Theological Seminary faculty
Fuller Theological Seminary alumni
Yale University alumni
American theologians